Miss America 1946, the 20th Miss America pageant, was held at the Boardwalk Hall in Atlantic City, New Jersey on September 7, 1946.

The winner, Marilyn Buferd, later became an actress, as did fourth runner-up Carol Ohmart and one of the 16 finalists, future Oscar and Emmy Award winner Cloris Leachman.

Results

Awards

Preliminary awards

Other awards

Contestants

References

Secondary sources

External links
 Miss America official website

1946
1946 in the United States
1946 in New Jersey
September 1946 events in the United States
Events in Atlantic City, New Jersey